KX is a data analysis software developer and vendor. It is a business unit of AIM-listed technology and services group FD Technologies (LON: FDP). Its KX Insights platform is built upon the proprietary time series database kdb+ and its programming language q. Kdb+ is optimized for ingesting, analyzing and storing massive amounts of structured data in real-time and has set multiple records in STAC Research benchmarks.
Kdb+ is used in financial modeling and data analysis by Wall Street investment banks, and energy, telecommunications, government, and other industries.

The company was founded in 1993 by Janet Lustgarten and Arthur Whitney.  Whitney is the developer of the k language. In 2014, First Derivatives increased their ownership interest to a 65 percent share of the privately held company as it began expanding its databases to retail, pharmaceuticals, and utilities. In 2018, First Derivatives (now FD Technologies plc) announced plans to buy out the remaining shares of KX. KX has offices in New York City, London, England, Ireland, Germany, Australia, Singapore, Tokyo, and Hong Kong.

Overview
In 1993, Whitney and Lustgarten joined together to commercialize the k programming platform Whitney had created after building the A+ language and other trading systems at Morgan Stanley. The purpose of the software was to access and explore large data volumes in financial services computer systems. Initially, Kx Systems had an exclusive contract with Swiss global financial services firm UBS to provide them with the K language.  In 1998, the contract with UBS expired and the firm launched the kdb+ database.  As part of kdb+, Whitney developed a new language named q that operates with k and uses English keywords.

In 1999, the firm reached a marketing agreement with Northern Ireland based firm, First Derivatives. Kx Systems opened an office in Manhattan in 2002, offices in Germany and Japan in 2003, and an office in Hong Kong in 2009.  In 2014, First Derivatives purchased a 65 percent share of Kx Systems, which began a trend in offering Kdb+ to other data-driven industries. Kx Systems has also partnered with the equity trading platform, IEX Group Inc., to conduct real-time market surveillance, which can be used to monitor actions such as insider trading.

To demonstrate this expansion of Kdb+ into verticals outside of finance, Kx has entered into a partnership with Aston Martin Red Bull Racing and has become a technology supplier to NASA's Frontier Development Lab. As of 2019 Kdb+ is available as an on-demand solution via the Amazon Web Services (AWS) Marketplace.

In July 2018, FD Technologies bought all remaining shares in KX Systems that it did not already hold. Co-founders Whitney and Lustgarten then went on to found Shakti.

Fusion Interfaces

As of mid 2018, Kx released a ‘Fusion’ initiative to increase the interface options for kdb+. These include:
  Python
  Java
  R
  Kafka
  Jupyter
  C#

References

External links
 

1993 establishments in the United States
Companies based in California
Technology companies of the United States